The Association for Clinical Biochemistry and Laboratory Medicine is a United Kingdom-based learned society dedicated to the practice and promotion of clinical biochemistry. It was founded in 1953 and its official journal is the Annals of Clinical Biochemistry. The association is a full, national society member of the International Federation of Clinical Chemistry and Laboratory Medicine IFCC as well as a full member of the regional European Federation of Clinical Chemistry and Laboratory Medicine.

History
Founded as the Association of Clinical Biochemists, the association has evolved as biochemistry has changed with advances in laboratory medicine. Recognizing an increasing number of medical members, the name was changed in 2005 to Association for Clinical Biochemistry. In 2007 the "Association of Clinical Scientists in Immunology" merged with the ACB. The membership expanded in 2010 with the merger with the "Association of Clinical Microbiologists". The broader nature of the membership contributed to the renaming of the ACB to its current name at the annual meeting in 2013.

Clinical concerns
The ACB is responsible for determining the specific content for courses related to certification as a clinical biochemist in the UK. Normally this is a three or four year academic sequence followed by qualification examinations. Because of the competitive admission criteria, many applicants have advanced degrees before beginning the biochemistry program.

Papers published by ACB members are related to the use of laboratories by doctors and patient health diagnostic testing in the UK.
 Blood draw procedures and tests by junior doctors and nurses in the A&E department of a Birmingham hospital were frequently performed with the wrong collection equipment or were mishandled afterward. The College of Emergency Medicine said the issue identified by the audit at Birmingham is "universally relevant".
 A 2008 study emphasized issues with junior doctors who were not being trained in pathology and laboratory testing. Eighteen percent of junior doctors in the sample were not confident they could interpret the results of tests they ordered for patients. More than 70% felt a need for more training in clinical biochemistry.

The ACB was part of a 2008 effort by a consortium to support a Scottish government initiative aimed at emphasizing the need for quality laboratory services to the practice of medicine.

References

Further reading

External links
 

Biochemistry organizations
Biology organisations based in the United Kingdom
Clinical pathology
Health in the London Borough of Southwark
Medical associations based in the United Kingdom
1952 establishments in the United Kingdom
Organisations based in the London Borough of Southwark
Organizations established in 1952